Harden is a small lunar impact crater that lies in the eastern part of the interior floor of the walled plain Mendeleev. It is located on the far side of the Moon, and cannot been seen from the Earth.

The crater is a circular, bowl-shaped feature with a slightly higher albedo than the surrounding terrain, but lacks the skirt of bright ejecta that many young impacts possess. The edge and interior are not notably eroded, and no significant craters overlie this feature. To the southeast of this crater, overlying the rim of Mendeleev, is the large Schuster.

References

 
 
 
 
 
 
 
 
 
 
 
 

Impact craters on the Moon